The Shopping City Süd (SCS) is a shopping centre located in Vösendorf and Wiener Neudorf, south of Vienna, Austria.

It contains over 330 shops and has around 5,000 employees (2016).

In December 2007, the SCS was sold for €607 million to French real estate company Unibail-Rodamco-Westfield, which also owns the Donauzentrum.

Facts 
 Opened 22 September 1976
 The first IKEA store in Austria (IKEA Vösendorf) opened at SCS in 1977
 Complete renovation and rebranding in 2012

Access 
The light rail station Vösendorf SCS of the Badner Bahn is located right in front of SCS. In addition, SCS is located just beside the junction of the Süd Autobahn (A2) and the Wiener Neustädter Straße (B17).

See also 
 List of the world's largest shopping malls

Notes

External links 
 
 

Shopping malls in Austria
Shopping malls established in 1976
Buildings and structures in Lower Austria
Tourist attractions in Lower Austria
Economy of Lower Austria
1976 establishments in Austria
Westfield Group
20th-century architecture in Austria